The Juno Awards of 2009 honoured music industry achievements in Canada in the latter part of 2007 and in most of 2008. These ceremonies were held in Vancouver, British Columbia, Canada during the weekend ending 29 March 2009.

Loverboy was inducted into the Canadian Music Hall of Fame, and Sarah McLachlan received the Allan Waters Humanitarian Award. Long-time broadcast executive Fred Sherratt, a former CHUM Limited executive, received the Walt Grealis Special Achievement Award.

Events
Preliminary award-related events began on 26 March 2009. The following day featured a Welcome Reception at the Commodore Ballroom and a Juno Cup ice hockey game at the UBC Thunderbird Arena.

Most awards were announced at a Gala Dinner and Awards which was a restricted-access, non-televised event at Vancouver's Westin Bayshore Hotel on 28 March 2009. The only multiple-category winner at that event was The Stills who won New Group of the Year and Alternative Album of the Year (Oceans Will Rise). Kardinal Offishall's single "Dangerous" was awarded Single of the Year, over competition from songs by established major artists such as Michael Bublé, Céline Dion and Nickelback.

Primary ceremonies

The primary awards ceremony on 29 March 2009 was telecast by CTV from General Motors Place and hosted for the second consecutive year by Russell Peters.

Artists performing at the ceremonies broadcast included City and Colour, Nickelback, Sarah McLachlan and Simple Plan. The complete list of performing artists was:

 Bryan Adams
 City and Colour
 Crystal Shawanda
 Divine Brown
 Eccodek
 Great Big Sea
 Hawksley Workman
 Kathleen Edwards
 Nickelback
 Sam Roberts
 Sarah McLachlan
 Serena Ryder
 Simple Plan
 The Stills

Nominees and winners
The band Nickelback received five Juno Award nominations, the most of any band or individual artist. Celine Dion and Hedley earned nominations in three categories apiece. Performances have also been scheduled from Simple Plan and Alexisonfire vocalist Dallas Green (performing as City and Colour).

Nominees were announced at a press conference on 5 February 2009. Reporters in attendance expressed an uncertain reaction to the announcement, particularly to the number of nominations given to the critically reviled Nickelback.

The following were the 2009 Juno nominees and winners:

Artist of the Year 

Winner: Sam Roberts

Other Nominees:
 Bryan Adams
 City and Colour (Dallas Green)
 k.d. lang
 Serena Ryder

Group of the Year 

Winner: Nickelback

Other Nominees:
 Great Big Sea
 Simple Plan
 Tokyo Police Club
 The Trews

New Artist of the Year 

Winner: Lights

Other Nominees:
Jessie Farrell
Crystal Shawanda
Kreesha Turner
Nikki Yanofsky

New Group of the Year 

Winner: The Stills

Other nominees:
Beast
Cancer Bats
Crystal Castles
Plants and Animals

Jack Richardson Producer of the Year

Winner: Daniel Lanois, "Here Is What Is" and "Not Fighting Anymore" (Daniel Lanois)

Other nominees:
Stuart Brawley, "Don’t Stop Now" and "Falling" (Emmy Rossum)
David Foster, "A Change Is Gonna Come" (Seal), "Silent Night" (Josh Groban)
k.d. lang, "I Dream of Spring" and "Coming Home" (k.d. lang)
Nickelback and Joey Moi (co-producer Mutt Lange), "Gotta Be Somebody" and "Something in Your Mouth" (Nickelback)

Recording Engineer of the Year

Winner: Kevin Churko, "Disappearing" and "The Big Bang" (Simon Collins)

Other nominees:
John "Beetle" Bailey, "Lucky" and "If I Were A Bell" (Molly Johnson)
Mike Fraser, "Rock N' Roll Train" (AC/DC), "Them Kids" (Sam Roberts)
Joey Moi, "Gotta Be Somebody" and "Never Gonna Be Alone" (Nickelback)
Randy Staub, "Something in Your Mouth" (Nickelback)

Songwriter of the Year

Winner:  City and Colour, "Waiting...", "Sleeping Sickness", "The Girl"

Other nominees:
Nathan Ferraro, "Never Again", "Change For You", "Unaware" (The Midway State)
Hedley, "Old School", "For The Nights I Can’t Remember" (with Dave Genn), "Never Too Late" (with Greig Nori) (Hedley)
Alanis Morissette, "Underneath", "Not As We", "In Praise of the Vulnerable Man" (Alanis Morissette)
Gordie Sampson, "When I Said I Would" (Whitney Duncan), "Just A Dream" (Carrie Underwood), "Davey Jones" (Gordie Sampson)

Fan Choice Award 

Winner: Nickelback

Other nominees:
Céline Dion
Feist
Hedley
The Lost Fingers

Nominated albums

Album of the Year 
Winner: Dark Horse, Nickelback

Other nominees:
Famous Last Words, Hedley
Lost in the 80's, The Lost Fingers
70’s Volume 2, Sylvain Cossette
Simple Plan, Simple Plan

Aboriginal Recording of the Year 
Winner: Running for the Drum, Buffy Sainte-Marie

Other nominees:
Auk/Blood, Tanya Tagaq
First Law of the Land, Billy Joe Green
No Lies (album)|No Lies, Tracy Bone
The World (And Everything In It), Team Rezofficial

Adult Alternative Album of the Year 
Winner: Is It O.K., Serena Ryder

Other nominees:
Asking for Flowers, Kathleen Edwards
The Baroness, Sarah Slean
Between the Beautifuls, Hawksley Workman
Exit Strategy of the Soul, Ron Sexsmith

Alternative Album of the Year 
Winner: Oceans Will Rise, The Stills

Other nominees:
The Chemistry of Common Life, Fucked Up
In the Future, Black Mountain
Parc Avenue, Plants and Animals
Soft Airplane, Chad VanGaalen

Blues Album of the Year 
Winner: Ramblin’ Son, Julian Fauth

Other nominees:
Acoustic Blues: Got 'Em from the Bottom, Big Dave McLean
Get Way Back: A Tribute to Percy Mayfield, Amos Garrett
Love & Sound, Garrett Mason
Mess of Blues, Jeff Healey

CD/DVD Artwork Design of the Year 
Winner: Anouk Pennel and Stéphane Poirer, En concert dans la forêt des mal-aimés avec l’Orchestre Métropolitain du Grand Montréal, Pierre Lapointe

Other nominees:
 John Cook, Kelly Ferguson, John James Audubon, Koko Bonaparte, Sugarbird, Paul Reddick
 Phoebe Greenberg, George Fok, Daniel Fortin, Leda & St. Jacques, Productions l’Éloi, Pulse of the Planet, Slim Williams
 Mark Sasso, Casey Laforet, Mountain Meadows, Elliott Brood
 Dallas Wehrle, Robyn Kotyk, Alex vs. Alex, Kensington Heights, Constantines

Children's Album of the Year 
Winner: Snacktime!, Barenaked Ladies

Other nominees:
Catchy Tune, Jack Grunsky
FiddleFire!, Chris McKhool
The Kerplunks, The Kerplunks
Oui!, Gregg LeRock

Contemporary Christian/Gospel Album of the Year 
Winner: Ending Is Beginning, Downhere

Other nominees:
Colors and Sounds, Article One
I Will Go, Starfield
Roar of Heaven, Life Support
Salvation Station, newworldson

Classical Album of the Year (large ensemble) 
Winner: Beethoven: Ideals Of The French Revolution, Orchestre symphonique de Montréal and Kent Nagano

Other nominees:
Bach: Métamorphoses, Orchestre symphonique de Québec and Yoav Talmi
Beethoven: Symphonies Nos. 7 & 8, Tafelmusik and Bruno Weil
Bruckner: Symphonie No 9, Orchestre Métropolitain du Grand Montréal and Yannick Nézet-Séguin
Haydn: Symphonies 62, 107 & 108, Toronto Chamber Orchestra and Kevin Mallon

Classical Album of the Year (solo or chamber ensemble) 
Winner: Homage, James Ehnes

Other nominees:
Haydn: Six Sonatas for Piano, Anton Kuerti
Schubert: Complete Piano Trios, The Gryphon Trio
Schumann: Sonata in F#Minor & Humoreske, Angela Hewitt
Shostakovich: 24 Preludes & Fugues opus 87, David Jalbert

Classical Album of the Year (vocal or choral performance) 
Winner: Gloria! Vivaldi’s Angels, Ensemble Caprice

Other nominees:
Bach and the Liturgical Year, Shannon Mercer and Luc Beauséjour
Handel: Arias, Karina Gauvin
Schumann: Dichterliebe & other Heine Settings, Gerald Finley
The Voice of Bach, Daniel Taylor

Francophone Album of the Year 
Winner: Tous les sens, Ariane Moffatt

Other nominees:
L’arbre aux parfums, Caracol
Cœur de pirate, Cœur de pirate
Tradarnac, Swing
Le volume du vent, Karkwa

Instrumental Album of the Year 
Winner: Nostomania, DJ Brace presents The Electric Nosehair Orchestra

Other nominees:
Auk/Blood, Tanya Tagaq
The Furniture Moves Underneath, Inhabitants
The Soundtrack, Creaking Tree String Quartet
Telescope, Steve Dawson

International Album of the Year 
Winner: Viva La Vida, Coldplay

Other nominees:

Black Ice, AC/DC
Chinese Democracy, Guns N’ Roses
Death Magnetic, Metallica
Sleep Through the Static, Jack Johnson

Contemporary Jazz Album of the Year 
Winner: Embracing Voices, Jane Bunnett

Other nominees:
A Bend in the River, Roberto Occhipinti
Existential Detective, Barry Romberg’s Random Access Large Ensemble
Rasstones, François Bourassa Quartet
The Sicilian Jazz Project, Michael Occhipinti

Traditional Jazz Album of the Year 
Winner: Second Time Around, Oliver Jones

Other nominees:
For Kenny Wheeler, Don Thompson Quartet
Small Wonder, Brad Turner Quartet
Solo, Chris Donnelly
TV Trio, John Stetch

Vocal Jazz Album of the Year 
Winner: Lucky, Molly Johnson

Other nominees:
Ella...Of Thee I Swing, Nikki Yanofsky
If the Moon Turns Green..., Diana Panton
Ima, Yvette Tollar
Parkdale, Elizabeth Shepherd

Pop Album of the Year 
Winner: Flavors of Entanglement, Alanis Morissette

Other nominees:
Holes, The Midway State
No Sleep at All, Creature
Passion, Kreesha Turner
Wake Up and Say Goodbye, David Usher

Rock Album of the Year 
Winner: Love at the End of the World, Sam Roberts

Other nominees:
Fortress, Protest The Hero
No Time for Later, The Trews
Parallel Play, Sloan
Terminal Romance, Matt Mays & El Torpedo

Roots and Traditional Album of the Year (Solo) 
Winner: Proof of Love, Old Man Luedecke

Other nominees:
The Contradictor, Ndidi Onukwulu
Ghost Notes, Matthew Barber
Happy Here, Suzie Vinnick
Tinderbox, Fred Eaglesmith

Roots and Traditional Album of the Year (Group) 
Winner: Chic Gamine, Chic Gamine

Other nominees:
 Fast Paced World, The Duhks
 Highway Prayer, Twilight Hotel
 Mountain Meadows, Elliott Brood
 XOK, NQ Arbuckle

World Music Album of the Year 
Winner: Africa to Appalachia, Jayme Stone and Mansa Sissoko

Other nominees:
 The Art of the Early Egyptian Qanun, George Dimitri Sawa
 Cairo to Toronto, Maryem & Ernie Tollar
 Contrabanda, Lubo and Kaba Horo
 Shivaboom, Eccodek

Nominated releases

Single of the Year 
Winner: "Dangerous", Kardinal Offishall

Other nominees:
 "Gotta Be Somebody", Nickelback
 "Lay It on the Line", Divine Brown
 "Lost", Michael Bublé
 "Taking Chances", Céline Dion

Classical Composition of the Year 
Winner: "Flanders Fields Reflections", John Burge

Other nominees:
 "From the Dark Reaches", T. Patrick Carrabré
 "Manhattan Music", Bramwell Tovey
 "Notes Towards A Poem That Can Never Be Written", Timothy Corlis
 "Song of Songs", Sid Robinovitch

Country Recording of the Year 
Winner: Beautiful Life, Doc Walker

Other nominees:
 Chasing the Sun, Tara Oram
 Dawn of a New Day, Crystal Shawanda
 Thankful, Aaron Pritchett
 What I Do, George Canyon

Dance Recording of the Year 
Winner: "Random Album Title", Deadmau5

Other nominees:
 "Everything’s Gonna Be Alright", James Doman
 "Get Blahsted", Hatiras and MC Flipside
 "Move For Me", Deadmau5 vs. Kaskade
 "Yes We Can", House Music United

Music DVD of the Year 
Winner: Blue Road (Blue Rodeo)

Other nominees:
Here Is What Is (Daniel Lanois)
It All Started With A Red Stripe (Moneen)
Live in Las Vegas - A New Day... (Céline Dion)
A MultiMedia Life (Buffy Sainte-Marie)

R&B/Soul Recording of the Year 
Winner: The Love Chronicles, Divine Brown

Other nominees:
Elise Estrada, Elise Estrada
Money, Zaki Ibrahim
The Promise, Deborah Cox
TONY, Ivana Santilli

Rap Recording of the Year 
Winner: Not 4 Sale, Kardinal Offishall

Other Nominees:
A Captured Moment in Time, DL Incognito
The Book, D-Sisive
I Rap Now, Famous
Point Blank, Point Blank

Reggae Recording of the Year 
Winner: "Everything", Humble

Other nominees:
"Jah Lift Me Up", Blessed
"Renegade Rocker", Dubmatix
"The Peacemaker’s Chauffeur", Jason Wilson
"Truth Will Reveal", Souljah Fyah

Video of the Year 
Winner: Anthony Seck, "Honey Honey" (Feist)

Other nominees:
 Davin Black, "Blond Kryptonite" (Saint Alvia)
 Wendy Morgan, "Going On" (Gnarls Barkley)
 Dave Pawsey, "Detroit '67" (Sam Roberts)
 Dave Pawsey, "Them Kids" (Sam Roberts)

Compilation CD
A compilation album for the awards was released in March 2009

References

External links
 Juno Awards official site
 Vancouver Host Committee for the 2009 Juno Awards (Music From Sea To Sky)

2009 music awards
2009
2009 in Canadian music
March 2009 events in Canada
2009 in British Columbia
Events in Vancouver